= Mainstream Energy Corporation =

Solar energy company in San Luis Obispo, CA, USA

- Company type: Private
- Industry: Solar Energy
- Founded: 2005
- Headquarters: San Luis Obispo, CA, United States
- Key people: Paul Winnowski — President and CEO
- Subsidiaries: REC Solar; AEE Solar; SnapNRack
- Website: mainstreamenergy.com

Mainstream Energy Corporation is a solar energy company founded in 2005. It is the parent company of REC Solar, AEE Solar, and SnapNRack.
